Baihe railway station is a station on the Baihe Railway and Hunbai Railway in Erdaobaihe, Antu County, Yanbian, Jilin, China.

The station was closed for passengers as passenger services moved to the nearby Changbaishan railway station which opened on the Dunhua-Baihe railway in 2021.

References

Railway stations in Yanbian
Railway stations closed in 2021
Antu County